The 1958 12-Hour Florida International Grand Prix of Endurance for the Amoco Trophy took place on 22 March, on the Sebring International Raceway, (Florida, United States).  It was the second round of the F.I.A. World Sports Car Championship, which was running to new regulations introduced at the beginning of the season. The most influential of these regulations changes would be the 3.0 litre engine size limit. This was seventh running of the 12-hour race.

Report

Entry

A massive total of 73 racing cars were registered for this event, of which 70 arrived for practice. Only these, 65 qualified for, and started the race. With these new rules, and Maserati on the brink of financial crisis, Scuderia Ferrari would head the Italian challenge. Ferrari had six of their 250 TRs in Florida, of which three were works machines for Phil Hill/Peter Collins, Mike Hawthorn/Wolfgang von Trips and Luigi Musso/Olivier Gendebien. Opposition would no longer come from Maserati... but from Aston Martin.

David Brown sent two Aston Martin DBR1s over from England for Stirling Moss/Tony Brooks and Carroll Shelby and Roy Salvadori. There were supported by George Constantine and John Dalton, in a DB2/4. Also on the entry list were some quick looking Jaguar D-Types though the Coventry marque were a bit out-classed by now. Ecurie Ecosse had two D-Types for Ron Flockhart/Masten Gregory and Ninian Sanderson/Ivor Bueb. Another Jag was entered by Briggs Cunningham for himself and Walt Hansgen. Cunningham also brought along two Jaguar engined Listers for Ed Crawford/Pat O'Connor and Archie Scott Brown/Hansgen. All three cars were listed with Alfred Momo being the entrant.

Qualifying

Because there were no qualifying sessions to set the grid, the starting positions were decided according to engine size with the 4.6 litre Chevrolet Corvette C1 of Jim Rathmann and Dick Doane in first place. Next was another  Corvette of John A. Kilborn, Fred Windridge and Dick Thompson. In fact Corvette’s held the first three places.

Race

Day of the race would be sunny and warm, but the start of race was something of a shambles as some drivers posed for the tradition Le Mans style start, ready to sprint to their cars, while others were still ambling across the track. This prompted a false start, so everyone had to line-up again.

From his third place of the grid, Jim Jeffords was expected to be quick off the line, and indeed he was but a wheel problem stopped him out on the circuit, and by the end of lap one, he crossed the line in last place.

The Aston Martins set the early pace with Moss going out in front. Hawthorn was second in his works Ferrari, with Salvadori in the other Aston on his tail. Soon, Salvadori moved past Hawthorn to make it an Aston 1-2. As for the Listers, they were going well in the opening laps, but Gendebien tried to force his Ferrari past Scott Brown, on the managed to climb right over the back of the Lister. Both drivers hopped out and removed the Ferrari and the Belgian took it back to the pits for repairs while the Lister retired. As for the other Lister, it only managed six laps before its Jaguar engine went  and all the Jaguar-powered cars were out of the race by lap 55.

As for the Hill/Collins Ferrari, it made a cautious start with the American behind the wheel. The crew decided to be easy on the gearbox and brakes which get worked so hard at Sebring. They were in fourth at the end of the first hour, with Moss/Brooks leading from Salvadori/Shelby and Hawthorn/von Trips. Their easy pace allowed the private 250 TR of Richie Ginther and Johnny von Neumann into fourth an hour later. The pair of Astons and the trio of Ferrari held the top five spots for the first four hours. The other works Ferrari of Musso/Gendebien started to recover from its early encounter.

It was all change in the fifth hour of the race when both Astons had gearbox troubles, which forces them to retire. Hill and Collins had progressively worked their way through to second and then took over the lead which they would not be moved. By the half-way mark, there were four Ferraris in the top four and that remained that way for the next five hours. Hawthorn and von Trips were out on lap 159, with Neumann and Ginther at lap 168. Hill and Collins still kept to a steady pace, the Musso/Gendebien car moved into second with the Porsche 718 RSK of Harry Schell and Wolfgang Seidel now up to third. Surprisingly, the little Lotus Eleven of Sam Weiss and David Tallakson had got into fourth overall.

And that's how the race finished, the Scuderia Ferrari of Collins and Hill, winning ahead of their team-mates Musso and Gendebien. Car number 14, took an impressive victory, completing 200 laps, covering 1,040 miles after 12 hours of racing, averaging a speed of 86.501 mph. Second place went to the second Ferrari, albeit one lap adrift. The podium was complete by works Porsche of Schell and Seidel who were seven laps behind the winners. Phil Hill and Peter Collins had established the Ferrari 250 TR as the main sports car championship contender, with its second straight victory in the series.

Official Classification

Class Winners are in Bold text.

 Fastest Lap: Stirling Moss, 3:20.0secs (93.600 mph)

Class Winners

Standings after the race

Note: Only the top five positions are included in this set of standings.Championship points were awarded for the first six places in each race in the order of 8-6-4-3-2-1, excepting the RAC Tourist Trophy, for which points were awarded on a 4-3-2-1 for the first four places. Manufacturers were only awarded points for their highest finishing car with no points awarded for positions filled by additional cars. Only the best 4 results out of the 6 races could be retained by each manufacturer. Points earned but not counted towards the championship totals are listed within brackets in the above table.

References

Further reading

Alec Ulmann. The Sebring Story. Chilton Book Company. ASIN B0006CUAP2.

12 Hours of Sebring
Sebring
Sebring
Sebring
Sebring